Miss Europe 2018 was the 61st edition of the Miss Europe pageant and was the third under the Miss Europe Organization. held in the Eiffel Tower in Paris, France on November 10, 2018. Anastasiya Ammosova of Russia & Anna Shornikova of Ukraine, were both crowned Miss Europe 2018 by out going titleholder Diana Kubasova of Latvia. The Miss Europe 2018 title holders were two winners from two separate countries. For the first time in pageant's 90-year history, the title is divided between two countries: Anastasia Ammosova from Russia and Anna Shornikova from Ukraine. The 1st runner up is Nika Kar from Slovenia and the 2nd runner up is Agatha Maksimova from France.

Results

Placements

Contestants 

 - Agatha Maksimova
 - Freideriki Memmou
 - Anastasiya Ammosova
 - Nika Kar
 - Anna Shornikova

References

External links 
 

Miss Europe
2018 beauty pageants
November 2018 events in France